Parnassius hide is a high-altitude butterfly which is found in China. It is a member of the snow Apollo genus (Parnassius) of the swallowtail family, Papilionidae. The species was first described by Satoshi Koiwaya in 1987.

Distribution
It is a rare and local species confined to a few areas in western China and Tibet. P. hide was not described until 1987 when it was discovered in the Kunlun Mountains of Qinghai, China.

Classification
This butterfly is closely related to P. patricius subspecies priamus. Five subspecies are described.

 P. h. meveli Weiss & Michel
 P. h. aksobhya Shinkai
 P. h. gamdensis Nose
 P. h. hengduanshanus Nose
 P. h. poshurarinus Nose

References

 Chou Io (Ed.) Monographia Rhopalocerum Sinensium.

External links
"Kailasius hide Koiwaya, 1987". Insecta.pro. Images and details. 

hide
Butterflies described in 1987